Same-sex marriage is legal in the following countries: Andorra, Argentina, Australia, Austria, Belgium, Brazil, Canada, Chile, Colombia, Costa Rica, Cuba, Denmark, Ecuador, Finland, France, Germany, Iceland, Ireland, Luxembourg, Malta, Mexico, the Netherlands, New Zealand, Norway, Portugal, Slovenia, South Africa, Spain, Sweden, Switzerland, Taiwan, the United Kingdom, the United States, and Uruguay.

Same-sex marriage is recognized, but not performed, in Israel. Furthermore, same-sex marriages performed in the Netherlands are recognized in Aruba, Curaçao and Sint Maarten. Whether same-sex couples should be allowed to marry has been and remains the topic of debate worldwide. 32 countries and four jurisdictions worldwide have passed constitutional amendments that explicitly prohibit the legal recognition of same-sex marriage and sometimes other forms of legal unions as well. Sixteen countries and 34 jurisdictions worldwide have authorized civil unions or unregistered cohabitation for same-sex couples as an alternative to marriage. The legal name of those unions as well as the number of rights that they provide can vary greatly.

Legislative efforts to recognise same-sex unions

National level
The first legislation of unregistered cohabitation was introduced in the Netherlands in June 1979. However, the first substantial recognition of same-sex couples didn't occur before the introduction of a new legal form, that of registered partnerships, which was first enacted in Denmark in June 1989. Many countries have followed with similar legislation since then. Legislation of these forms of legal unions still occur with a variety of different names, even after the introduction of same sex marriage, although sometimes they are overwritten by subsequent legislation of same-sex marriage.

There are currently 13 countries that have an alternative form of legal recognition other than marriage on a national level. Those are  Bolivia, Croatia, Cyprus, the Czech Republic, Estonia, Greece, Hungary, Israel, Italy, Liechtenstein, Monaco, Montenegro and San Marino.

Notes:

Sub-national level

In countries with a federal system of governance, states and territories often may grant recognition to same-sex couples in their own jurisdictions, although unitary states with a level of devolution, such as Spain or the United Kingdom, also offer such powers to local authorities. The first jurisdiction to enact unregistered cohabitation was British Columbia in Canada in July 1992. The first jurisdiction to legalize registered partnership was Greenland as part of the Kingdom of Denmark in April 1996. Finally, the first sub-national jurisdiction to legalize same-sex marriage was the Canadian province of Ontario in June 2003.

Those are:
 In Japan:
Twelve prefectures of Japan (Akita, Aomori, Fukuoka, Gunma, Ibaraki, Mie, Osaka, Saga, Shizuoka, Tochigi, Tokyo, and Toyama);
Ten special wards of Tokyo (Adachi, Arakawa, Bunkyō, Edogawa, Kita, Minato, Nakano, Setagaya, Shibuya, and Toshima);
Eighteen designated cities of Japan (Chiba, Fukuoka, Hamamatsu, Hiroshima, Kawasaki, Kitakyushu, Kumamoto, Kyoto, Nagoya, Niigata, Okayama, Osaka, Sagamihara, Saitama, Sakai, Sapporo, Shizuoka, and Yokohama);
Twenty-seven core cities of Japan (Akashi, Akita, Amagasaki, Funabashi, Hakodate, Himeji, Hirakata, Ichinomiya, Kagoshima, Kanazawa, Kashiwa, Kawagoe, Kōchi, Koshigaya, Kurashiki, Matsumoto, Miyazaki, Nagano, Nagasaki, Naha, Nara, Nishinomiya, Okazaki, Takamatsu, Toyohashi, Toyota, and Yokosuka);
Twelve special cities of Japan (Atsugi, Chigasaki, Fuji, Hiratsuka, Kasugai, Kumagaya, Nagaoka, Odawara, Sōka, Takarazuka, Tokorozawa, and Yamato);
139 cities of Japan (Ageo, Akitakata, Anan, Annaka, Asakuchi, Ashiya, Awa, Ayase, Bizen, Bungo-Ōno, Chōfu, Daitō, Ebetsu, Ebina, Ebino, Echizen, Fuchū (Tokyo), Fujimi, Fujimino, Fujisawa, Fukaya, Fukuchiyama, Fukutsu, Gamagōri, Gyōda, Hakusan, Hannō, Hashimoto, Hatsukaichi, Hidaka, Higashikagawa, Higashimatsuyama, Hikone, Hirosaki, Hita, Honjō (Saitama), Hyūga, Ibaraki (Osaka), Ibusuki, Ichikawa, Ichinoseki, Iga, Ikeda, Ikoma, Inabe, Iruma, Itami, Iwamizawa, Kaizuka, Kamakura, Kameoka, Kan'onji, Kanuma, Karatsu, Kasaoka, Katano, Kawanishi, Kikuchi, Kitami, Kitamoto, Koga (Fukuoka), Koganei, Kokubunji (Tokyo), Komagane, Komaki, Kōnan, Kōnosu, Kosai, Kōshū, Kuki, Kunitachi, Maniwa, Marugame, Matsudo, Mihara, Mima, Minamiashigara, Misato, Mitoyo, Miura, Miyoshi (Aichi), Miyoshi (Hiroshima), Miyoshi (Tokushima), Mukō, Musashino, Nagaokakyō, Nankoku, Narashino, Naruto, Nasushiobara, Nichinan, Nikkō, Nishio, Nisshin, Nobeoka, Nonoichi, Obihiro, Okegawa, Ōtawara, Saito, Sakado, Sakaide, Sakaiminato, Sanda, Sanjō, Sano, Sanuki, Sayama, Seki, Setouchi, Shibukawa, Shinshiro, Shiraoka, Sōja, Tahara, Takahama, Taketa, Tama, Tatsuno, Tenri, Tochigi, Toda, Tokushima, Tomakomai, Tondabayashi, Tosashimizu, Toyoake, Toyokawa, Ube, Urasoe, Urayasu, Usuki, Wakō, Yamatokōriyama, Yashio, Yoshikawa, Yoshinogawa, Zama, Zentsūji, and Zushi);
Fifty towns of Japan (Aikawa (Kanagawa), Ayagawa, Chiyoda, Fuchū, Hatoyama, Hayama, Ina (Saitama), Inagawa, Kadogawa, Kaisei, Kaita, Kamikawa (Saitama), Kamimine, Kamisato, Kasuya, Kawajima, Kijō, Kikuyō, Kitajima, Kotohira, Kurashio, Mannō, Matsuda, Misato (Saitama), Miyashiro, Moroyama, Miki, Miyoshi, Naka, Nakai, Ninomiya, Nogi, Ogano, Ōi (Kanagawa), Ōiso, Ōizumi, Ōzu (Kumamoto), Ranzan, Samukawa, Shintomi, Shōdoshima, Tadotsu, Tokigawa, Tonoshō, Toyoyama, Utazu, Yamakita, Yokoze, Yoshimi, and Yoshioka);
 One village of Japan (Kiyokawa);
 Aruba, a constituent country of the Kingdom of the Netherlands;
 Two British overseas territories (Bermuda, Cayman Islands).

For the time being, 58 sub-national jurisdictions worldwide have legalized same-sex marriage in nations where same-sex marriage is not legal throughout the nation's territory. Those are:

 Forty-eight Native American Tribal Nations, namely the Ak-Chin Indian Community, the Bay Mills Indian Community, the Blackfeet Nation, the Blue Lake Rancheria, the Central Council of the Tlingit and Haida Indian Tribes of Alaska, the Cherokee Nation, the Cheyenne and Arapaho Tribes, the Chickasaw Nation, the Colorado River Indian Tribes, the Confederated Tribes of Coos, Lower Umpqua and Siuslaw Indians, the Confederated Tribes of Siletz Indians, the Confederated Tribes of the Colville Reservation, Confederated Tribes of the Grand Ronde Community of Oregon, the Coquille Indian Tribe, the Eastern Shoshone Tribe, the Fond du Lac Band of Lake Superior Chippewa, the Fort McDermitt Paiute and Shoshone Tribes, the Fort McDowell Yavapai Nation, the Grand Portage Band of Chippewa, the Hannahville Indian Community, the Ho-Chunk Nation of Wisconsin, the Iipay Nation of Santa Ysabel, the Keweenaw Bay Indian Community, the Lac du Flambeau Band of Lake Superior Chippewa, the Leech Lake Band of Ojibwe, the Little Traverse Bay Bands of Odawa Indians, the Mashantucket Pequot Tribal Nation, the Menominee Indian Tribe of Wisconsin, the Northern Arapaho Tribe, the Oglala Sioux Tribe, the Oneida Nation of Wisconsin, the Osage Nation, the Pascua Yaqui Tribe, the Pokagon Band of Potawatomi Indians, the Ponca Tribe of Nebraska, the Port Gamble S'Klallam Tribe, the Prairie Island Indian Community, the Puyallup Tribe of Indians, the Salt River Pima-Maricopa Indian Community, the San Carlos Apache Tribe, the Sault Ste. Marie Tribe of Chippewa Indians, the Stockbridge-Munsee Community, the Suquamish Tribe, the Tulalip, the Turtle Mountain Band of Chippewa Indians of North Dakota, the White Mountain Apache Tribe, the Winnebago Tribe of Nebraska and the Yavapai-Apache Nation.
 The British Overseas Territories of Akrotiri and Dhekelia, the British Antarctic Territory, the British Indian Ocean Territory, the Falkland Islands, Gibraltar, the Pitcairn Islands, Saint Helena, Ascension and Tristan da Cunha and South Georgia and the South Sandwich Islands, and the British Crown dependencies of Guernsey, the Isle of Man and Jersey, and Guernsey's own dependencies of Alderney and Sark.

Note:

Prohibition of same-sex unions

Legislative efforts
Various countries have passed (or tried to pass) legislation to prevent same-sex marriage or repeal the existing laws (in some cases including criminalization or fines). Sometimes approving explicit bans or defining marriage as solely the union between a man and a woman, excluding all others.

National level

Notes:

Constitutional efforts
Thirty-two countries have passed constitutional amendments banning a variety of same-sex unions. These amendments have taken several forms. Some are limited to banning only marriage. Others ban marriage and prohibit legislation providing "similar rights".

National level
Cuba was the first country to prohibit same-sex marriage in February 1976. Paraguay, Honduras and Bolivia are the only cases that not only marriage is prohibited but also de facto unions. Vietnam, Cuba and Ecuador, repealed their same-sex marriage bans in November 2013, April 2019, and June 2019, respectively.

Those are Armenia, Belarus, Bolivia, Bulgaria, Burkina Faso, Burundi, Cambodia, the Central African Republic, Croatia, the Democratic Republic of the Congo, Dominican Republic, Georgia, Honduras, Hungary, Jamaica, Kenya, Kyrgyzstan, Latvia, Lithuania, Moldova, Montenegro, Palau, Paraguay, Poland, Russia, Rwanda, Serbia, Slovakia, South Sudan, Uganda, Ukraine, Venezuela and Zimbabwe.

Notes:

Sub-national level
The first jurisdiction to explicitly ban same-sex marriage in its Constitution was the U.S. state of Alaska in November 1998, however, same-sex marriage was legalised in the state in October 2014. The first jurisdiction to enact such a ban was Yucatán, in July 2009, but since August 2010 the state recognizes same-sex marriages performed in Mexico and in August 2021 local congress removed the heterosexual definition of marriage from the state's constitution.

Notes:

See also
 LGBT rights by country or territory
 Same-sex union court cases

Notes

References